MAN NL262 (A27) is a low-floor single-decker bus made by MAN from 1992 to 1998. Although predominantly produced for Hong Kong in right-hand drive operated by Citybus, some were made in left-hand drive for the mainland European market, it was still built within the similar MAN NL202. It was succeeded by the MAN Lion's City.

Operations

Hong Kong

Citybus
Citybus was the only operator to acquire new NL262s in Hong Kong. In all 80 NL262s in total were ordered as 1501–1580.

New Lantao Bus
5 buses all in total (ex-Citybus 1576–1580).

DBTSL
10 buses all in total (5 were second hand buses, former Citybus 1570–1574).

Low-floor buses
NL262
Vehicles introduced in 1992